The men's heptathlon event at the 2015 European Athletics Indoor Championships was held between March 7 and 8.

Medalists

Results

60 metres

Long jump

Shot put

High jump

60 metres hurdles

Pole vault

1000 metres

Final results

References

Combined events at the European Athletics Indoor Championships
2015 European Athletics Indoor Championships